is a Japanese voice actress affiliated with 81 Produce.

Voice roles

Anime
Bakusou Kyoudai Let's & Go!! MAX (Keichi Saijou)
Gregory Horror Show (James)
Hanaukyo Maid Team (Joshou (episode 7))
Let's Dance With Papa (Fukko Amachi)
Panyo Panyo Di Gi Charat (Newborn Chick)

Tokusatsu
Denji Sentai Megaranger (NeziPink (eps. 38 - 40, 47 - 48)/NeziJealous (ep. 40, 48))
Kamen Rider Kiva (Moth Fiangire (ep. 3 - 4))

Dubbing
Thomas the Tank Engine & Friends (Emily (Succeeding Yuka Shioyama), Frieda, The Second Slip Coach, An An and The Duchess of Boxford (Replacing Kumiko Itō))

References

External links

81 Produce voice actors
Japanese voice actresses
Voice actresses from Tokyo
Living people
1974 births